Abdulla Jihad served as Vice President of Maldives from 22 June 2016 to 17 November 2018. Prior to his appointment on 22 June 2016, he served as the Minister of Finance.

Mr Abdulla Jihad was born on 3 January 1963. He graduated from the University of Waikato, New Zealand, with a Master of Management Studies in Economics. He also holds a Bachelor of Arts majoring in economics/management from the University of South Pacific, Fiji.

Mr Jihad first joined Government services in 1980 as a temporary audit staff at the Audit Office. He later went on to fill a number of prestigious managerial posts in the Government. On 22 June 2016, he was appointed as the Vice President of the Republic of Maldives by President Abdulla Yameen Abdul Gayoom.

Prior to assuming the post of Vice President of the Maldives, Mr Jihad served as the Minister of Finance and Treasury in President Yameen’s Administration. He had also served as the Minister of Finance and Treasury in President Mohamed Waheed Hassan Manik's Administration from 5 March 2012 to 17 November 2013, and in President Maumoon Abdul Gayoom's Administration; 15 July 2008 to 11 November 2008. Other notable posts Mr Jihad filled were governor of Maldives Monetary Authority (2007-2008), and Member of the Civil Service Commission.

Mr Jihad has attended many international conferences, seminars, workshops and training programmes and has visited numerous countries in the discharge of Government responsibilities.

Mr Jihad is married to Ms Asima Hussein. They have 3 children.

Early career and family life 
Abdulla Jihad was born and raised in Thinadhoo of South Huvadhoo Atoll.

References 

Vice presidents of the Maldives
Finance ministers of the Maldives
Government ministers of the Maldives
Maldivian politicians
Governors of Maldives Monetary Authority
Progressive Party of Maldives politicians
University of the South Pacific alumni
University of Waikato alumni
1963 births
Living people